This is the list of cathedrals in Laos sorted by denomination.

Roman Catholic
Cathedrals of the Roman Catholic Church in Laos:
 Sacred Heart Cathedral, Vientiane
 Co-Cathedral of St. Therese, Savannakhet
 Cathedral of the Sacred Heart in Pakse
 Cathedral of St. Louis in Thakhek

See also

List of cathedrals
Christianity in Laos

References

Cathedrals in Laos
Laos
Cathedrals